Ida-Virumaa FC Alliance is an Estonian football club operating in Ida-Viru County. They play in the Esiliiga, the second highest level of Estonian football league pyramid. The club was created in 2012, when Kohtla-Järve JK Alko and Kohtla-Järve FC Lootus joined together. Before 2021, the team was called Kohtla-Järve JK Järve.

Before the 2023 season, the club moved their home matches from Spordikeskuse Staadion in Kohtla-Järve to Kiviõli Arena in Kiviõli.

Players

Current squad
''As of 10 August, 2022.

Seasons in Estonian football

References

External links
 JK Järve Kohtla-Järve official website 
 Team page at Estonian Football Association

 
Football clubs in Estonia
Association football clubs established in 2012
2012 establishments in Estonia
Sport in Kohtla-Järve